Michelle Chen Yanxi (born Chen Mei-hsuan; 31 May 1983) is a Taiwanese actress and singer.

Chen is best known for starring in the 2011 film You Are the Apple of My Eye, which broke box office records for Chinese-language films in mainland China, Taiwan, Hong Kong and Singapore. Chen is also known for the films Hear Me (2009), Badges of Fury (2013), Pali Road (2015), as well as the TV series The Romance of the Condor Heroes (2014).

Early life 
Michelle Chen was born and raised in Taipei. After middle school, she studied at Southwestern Academy in California in the United States, eventually graduating from the University of Southern California with a bachelor's degree in business administration in 2005. She speaks English and Chinese (Mandarin and Taiwanese Hokkien) fluently. In 2006, while visiting family in Taiwan, Chen caught the eye of renowned producer Angie Chai, who was responsible for the success of talent such as F4 and Rainie Yang, among other popular idols. Chen wanted to break into music at the time, but due to the slow growth of the industry, was persuaded instead by Chai to start her career in acting.

Career
2007 Chen signed a contract with the company Comic Dialogue Theme by Angie Chai. Initially she wanted to be a singer, but the company wanted her to try to advance in the field of cinema. She therefore played supporting roles in several films and television series and caught attention for her lovely and cute looks, but did not leave much impression.

2009  She starred in the movie Hear Me as a swimming athlete with hearing disabilities. Her acting captured people's hearts and helped her clinch the nomination for the "Best New Actress Award" at the 46th Golden Horse Film Festival and Awards.

2011 
After seeing success with her debut film Hear Me, Chen starred in the hit Taiwanese film You Are the Apple of My Eye (2011). The film was written and directed by Giddens Ko, produced by Angie as executive, and based on Ko's novel. In the film, Chen plays the role of Shen Chia-yi. The film broke records at the box office, becoming the 4th highest grossing domestic Taiwanese film. In the film's soundtrack, she also wrote and sang the song ( " 孩子氣 " ). For her performance in the film, Chen was also nominated for a "Best Actress" award at the 46th Golden Horse Film Festival and Awards.

Due to the success of You Are the Apple of My Eye,  Michelle Chen was cast in the lead role of the film Badges of Fury starring Jet Li , Donnie Yen and Simon Yam.

2013 
In May, Chen released her debut album Me, Myself, and I. Including some self-composed songs, the album received an average response from critics and music listeners.

2014 
After termination of the contract with the company Comic Voice Tri in 2012, Chen was cast as Xiaolongnü in The Romance of the Condor Heroes. Her casting announcement was met with widespread opposition from the public, with criticisms leveled at her appearance, which is not as light and angelic as the description of Xiaolongnu in the book.

2015 
Michelle Chen starred in two new series set for release in 2015. In the movie Young For You, she role in He plays Qiu Zi, and drama. The Legend of Qin (animated TV series) role in Duanmu Rong shoulder.

2016 to present 
In 2016, she starred in Pali Road where she played the role of Lily with actor Jackson Rathbone. The movie, filmed and set in Hawaii, was a collaboration between the US and China.

Personal life
In 2015, Michelle Chen began dating her The Romance of the Condor Heroes co-star Chen Xiao. On July 19, Michelle married Chen Xiao in Beijing, and another wedding banquet was held in Taipei on July 21, 2016. Chen gave birth to their first son in 2016, named him Chen Muchen. The pair will also star in Quentin Lee's Morning, Paris! (巴黎早安), a romantic comedy that was filmed in September 2015 and set for a 2016 release.

Michelle Chen has an older sister.

Filmography

Film

Television series

Variety show
2011–12 Miss Traveler (WOMAN愛旅行) on Chinese Television System — co-host (3 episodes)
2015 Yes! Coach (报告！教练) on Dragon Television — reality show contestant

Discography

Studio albums

Other songs
All songs are in Mandarin.

Awards and nominations

References

External links

 
 Michelle Chen on Sina Weibo
 Michelle Chen on Facebook
 Michelle Chen on Instagram

1983 births
21st-century Taiwanese actresses
21st-century Taiwanese singers
Musicians from Taipei
Actresses from Taipei
Taiwanese film actresses
Taiwanese television actresses
Living people
Marshall School of Business alumni
Participants in Chinese reality television series
21st-century Taiwanese women singers